Shin Mi-sung (born April 15, 1978) is a South Korean curler who competed at the 2014 Winter Olympics for South Korea.

Career
Shin was born in Seoul, South Korea, and competed at the 2014 Winter Olympics for South Korea. She teamed with Kim Ji-sun, Lee Seul-bee, Gim Un-chi and Um Min-ji in the women's tournament. She began the tournament playing second, but ended up playing only four of the nine games, as the South Korean team went 3-6 to finish in a tie for 8th. She curled 73%, which was 9th out of the 10 seconds.

Shin made her World Curling Championships debut in 2002 as second for Kim Mi-yeon. It was the first time the South Korean team qualified for a World Championship. They finished with a winless 0–9 record. In 2009, the Kim Mi-yeon team went 3–6. Her other three appearances were with the Kim Ji-sun rink with whom she went to the Olympics with. Their best finish was fourth place finishes at both the 2012 and 2014 Championships.

As of 2014, Shin has participated in 10 Pacific-Asia Curling Championships, winning the event on three occasions.

Education
 Sungshin Women's University

References

External links

1978 births
Living people
Olympic curlers of South Korea
Curlers from Seoul
Curlers at the 2014 Winter Olympics
South Korean female curlers
Asian Games medalists in curling
Curlers at the 2003 Asian Winter Games
Medalists at the 2003 Asian Winter Games
Asian Games silver medalists for South Korea
Sungshin Women's University alumni
Pacific-Asian curling champions
South Korean Buddhists